Gull Harbor is a bay in the U.S. state of Washington.

Gull Harbor was named for seagulls which congregate at the bay.

References

Landforms of Thurston County, Washington
Bays of Washington (state)